The 28th Mieczysław Połukard Criterium of Polish Speedway League Aces will be the 2009 version of the Criterium of Aces. It took place on 29 March at the Polonia Stadium in Bydgoszcz, Poland. In the 2008 season, Criterium was won by multi-winner Tomasz Gollob, who beat junior Emil Saifutdinov and Tomasz Chrzanowski.

Start list 
  (7) Andreas Jonsson - Polonia Bydgoszcz
  Wiesław Jaguś - Unibax Toruń
  Tomasz Gapiński - Włókniarz Częstochowa
  Krzysztof Jabłoński - Start Gniezno
  (15) Emil Saifutdinov - Polonia Bydgoszcz
  Jarosław Hampel - Unia Leszno
  Piotr Protasiewicz - Falubaz Zielona Góra
  Krzysztof Buczkowski - Polonia Bydgoszcz
  (8) Rune Holta - Caelum Stal Gorzów Wlkp.
  (13) Grzegorz Walasek - Falubaz Zielona Góra
  Krzysztof Kasprzak - Unia Leszno
  Jonas Davidsson - Polonia Bydgoszcz
  (14) Sebastian Ułamek - Unia Tarnów
  Tomasz Chrzanowski - Polonia Bydgoszcz
  Adrian Miedziński - Unibax Toruń
  Tomasz Jędrzejak - Atlas Wrocław

Note: riders in bold type are Polonia' riders. Riders with numbers are 2009 Speedway Grand Prix riders.

Notconfirmed:
  (3) Tomasz Gollob - Stal Gorzów Wlkp.
  Adam Skórnicki - Lotos Gdańsk

Heat details

See also 
 Speedway in Poland

References 

Criterium of Aces
Mieczysław Połukard Criterium of Polish Speedway Leagues Aces